The two-man bobsleigh results at the 1936 Winter Olympics in Garmisch-Partenkirchen. The competition was held on Friday and Saturday, 14 and 15 February 1936.

Medallists

Results

References

External links
1936 bobsleigh two-man results

Bobsleigh at the 1936 Winter Olympics